Channel A may refer to:

 Channel A (TV channel)
 Channel A (TV series)